Jang Won-young (born August 31, 2004), known mononymously as Wonyoung, is a South Korean singer and model. She is a member of Ive under Starship Entertainment and a former member of project girl group Iz*One after finishing first in Mnet's girl group survival reality television show Produce 48.

Early life and education 
Jang Won-young was born in Seoul on August 31, 2004.

After starting Iz*One's activities, Off the Record announced Jang and her parents' intention to home-school in April 2019. She subsequently left Yonggang Middle School and took the qualification exam. Jang passed with a perfect score in Korean, English, and mathematics. Jang graduated from  School of Performing Arts Seoul on February 9, 2023.

Career

2018–present: Produce 48, Iz*One and Ive 

From June 15 to August 31, 2018, Jang represented Starship Entertainment alongside An Yu-jin and Cho Ka-hyeon on the girl group survival reality television show Produce 48. She eventually placed first and debuted with Iz*One.

Iz*One's Korean debut extended play (EP) Color*Iz was released on October 29, 2018, under Off the Record label, with "La Vie en Rose" serving as its title track. Both the EP and its lead single received immediate commercial success, allowing the group to receive the New Artist of the Year award at several awards ceremonies, including Golden Disc Awards and Seoul Music Awards. 

The group's Japanese debut single, "Suki to Iwasetai", was released on February 6, 2019, under UMG's EMI Records label. Along with the group's Japanese debut promotion, Jang was selected alongside the Japanese member Sakura Miyawaki to center a collaboration stage between Nogizaka46, Keyakizaka46 and AKB48 on FNS Music Festival. At the start of September 2019, Jang was chosen to walk the runway on 29th Tokyo Girls Collection 2019 Autumn/Winter held at Saitama Super Arena, marking her runway debut. She reappeared, in the same year, on the runway for 29th Tokyo Girls Collection 2019 Autumn/Winter held in Kitakyushu. 

After Iz*One's disbandment on April 29, 2021, Jang returned to be a trainee under Starship Entertainment along with group mate and label mate An Yu-jin. In September 2021, she was announced as the new host for Music Bank with Enhypen Sung-hoon. Her contract as a host with Music Bank was extended in September 2022, with changes in co-host to Lee Chae-min. On November 4, 2021, Starship Entertainment revealed Jang as one of the six members in their new girl group Ive.

On December 1, 2021, Jang officially debuted as a member of Ive with the release of their single album, Eleven, led by the single of the same name and "Take It". She was chosen to host for 2021 Asia Artist Awards on December 2 along with Leeteuk. On July 15, 2022, Jang was once again selected to host the 2022 Asia Artist Awards held in Japan on December 13 with Leeteuk. In the same year, she was revealed to host the 2022 KBS Song Festival on December 16 with Na In-woo and Kim Shin-young. In September 2022, Jang attended the 2022 Paris Fashion Week as an ambassador for luxury fashion brands Miu Miu and Fred Joaillier.

Endorsements 

During her trainee period at Starship Entertainment early 2018, Jang was chosen as a model on a music video sponsored by Pepsi KOREA called "LOVE IT LIVE IT", along with YDPP and Park Sun.

Alongside with her activities in Iz*One, Jang has appeared as a promotional model for many magazine covers, including Beauty Plus, Vogue Korea, and Elle Korea for various brand name beauty products in South Korea such as Dior, Miu Miu, and Laura Mercier. She also appeared in GQ Korea's July 2020 Issue. In the Elle Korea February 2021 issue, Jang posed as a model and cover girl for the Miu Miu Pre-Spring 2021 collection with Kim Min-ju. She was listed among the K-icons for Miu Miu along with Im Yoon-ah during the Autumn/Winter 2021 Fashion Week. In 2021, Jang was chosen as a model on a music video named "ZERO:ATTITUDE", which was sponsored by Pepsi under the name of Iz*One for Pepsi 2021 K-Pop Campaign. The campaign was revealed by her parent agency Starship Entertainment as a collaboration between Iz*One and Soyou, featuring pH-1.

After Iz*One's disbandment, Jang appeared in several fashion films, namely Chaumet's Joséphine Collection and Miu Miu's Maritime. On July 27, 2021, Amorepacific Corporation announced that Jang has been chosen as global ambassador of its natural cosmetics brand Innisfree. In October 2021, Jang was officially announced as Kirsh's new muse. She represented Kirsh as the brand chosen model for 2021 winter collection and 2022 SS collection. In the Harper's Bazaar Korea December 2021 issue, for which she was the cover girl, Jang was officially announced as Miu Miu's brand ambassador. Following the announcement, she appeared in Y Magazine's April 2022 issue to represent the Miu Miu Spring 2022 ready-to-wear collection and Bvlgari's Divas' Dream collection.

Following Jang's re-debut as a member of Ive, she continued her solo activities as a brand model for various fashion and lifestyle brands. On May 20, 2022, Jang was officially announced as the newest model for SK Telecom. In June 2022, she was chosen as a model along with group mate Leeseo for the Pepsi 2022 K-Pop Campaign. The campaign was revealed by Starship Entertainment as a collaboration between Ive, Cravity, and Oh My Girl for a promotional music video named "Blue & Black". On July 18, 2022, Jang was selected as the ambassador for the golf wear brand GOSPHERES. She represented the brand in a pictorial for the August 2022 issue of Elle Korea. On July 21, 2022, she was officially unveiled as a global model and new muse for the color contact lens brand Hapa Kristin. On August 16, 2022, she was officially selected as the new model for the French outdoor fashion brand Eider. On August 19, 2022, Jang was announced as the first Korean ambassador for the French jewelry and watch brand Fred Joaillier. She represented the brand in a pictorial for the September 2022 issue of Marie Claire Korea. In September 2022, Jang appeared as a muse for Suecomma Bonnie, a South Korean shoe brand under Kolon Industries. In February 2023, Jang became the new muse for South Korean casual fashion brand SJSJ.

Discography

Promotional singles

Composition credits
All song credits are adapted from the Korea Music Copyright Association's database unless stated otherwise.

Filmography

Television shows

Hosting

Music videos

Music videos appearances

Awards and nominations

Notes

References

External links

  

2004 births
Living people
South Korean female idols
South Korean women pop singers
21st-century South Korean women singers
Ive (group) members
Singers from Seoul
Starship Entertainment artists
South Korean dance musicians
Produce 48 contestants
Iz*One members
Reality show winners
Japanese-language singers of South Korea
School of Performing Arts Seoul alumni